Clube Atlético do Porto, usually known simply as Porto (or Porto de Caruaru or Porto-PE), is a Brazilian football team from the city of Caruaru, Pernambuco state, founded on July 23, 1983.

Porto's rival is Central, which is another Caruaru football club.

History
On July 23, 1983, the club was founded by Rua Coronel Francisco Rodrigues Porto (Coronel Francisco Rodrigues Porto Street) residents.

In January 1994, the club joined the Pernambuco Football Federation, and in the same year, Porto competed in the Campeonato Brasileiro Série C for the first time, but was eliminated in the first stage.

In 1995, again the club was eliminated in the Campeonato Brasileiro Série C first stage. In 1996, Porto reached the Campeonato Brasileiro Série C semifinals, but the club was defeated by Vila Nova. In 1997, the club competed in the Campeonato Brasileiro Série C again, but was eliminated by Ferroviário in the second stage. In 1999, the club competed in the Copa do Brasil and in the Campeonato do Nordeste. In both competitions the club was eliminated in the first stage.

In 2000, Porto competed in the Copa João Havelange's Green Module, which was the season's equivalent to the Campeoanato Brasileiro's third level, and was eliminated in the first level. In 2003, Porto won the Campeonato Pernambucano Second Level, beating Serrano, Centro Limoeirense and Barreiros in the final four group stage. In 2004, the club competed again in the Campeonato Brasileiro Série C, but was eliminated in the third stage by Treze. In 2006, Porto was eliminated in the Campeonato Brasileiro Série C's second stage. In 2007, the club competed again in the Campeonato Brasileiro Série C, and again was eliminated in the second stage.

Stadium
Porto's home stadium is Antônio Inácio de Souza Stadium, with a maximum capacity of 6,000 people.

The club also owns a training ground, named CT Ninho do Gavião, meaning Hawk's Nest.

Current squad

Out on loan

Achievements
Campeonato Pernambucano Série A2
Winners (1): 2003
Copa Pernambuco
Winner (1): 1999

References

1994 Campeonato Brasileiro Série C at RSSSF
1995 Campeonato Brasileiro Série C at RSSSF
1996 Campeonato Brasileiro Série C at RSSSF
1997 Campeonato Brasileiro Série C at RSSSF
1999 Copa do Brasil at RSSSF
1999 Campeonato do Nordeste at RSSSF
2000 Copa João Havelange at RSSSF

2003 Campeonato Pernambucano Second Level at RSSSF
2004 Campeonato Brasileiro Série C at RSSSF
2006 Campeonato Brasileiro Série C at RSSSF
2007 Campeonato Brasileiro Série C at RSSSF
 Vice-líder enfrenta o rival - Central e Porto fazem o clássico de Caruaru no domingo - Globo Esporte (retrieved on February 2, 2007)

External links
 Clube Atlético do Porto's official website

 
Porto
1983 establishments in Brazil
Football clubs in Pernambuco